This is a list of schools in Muntinlupa, Metro Manila, Philippines.

Tunasan
Kaku School GT
Divine Gift Learning Center
Divine Mercy School
Holy Infant Academy (Main Campus)
Holy Queen of La Salette School
Infant Jesus Montessori School of Muntinlupa - Parkhomes
Mountaintop Christian Academy
Muntinlupa Science High School
Ridgeview Academy
Santo Niño School of Muntinlupa
Servite School, Inc.
The Birthright School of Muntinlupa
Tunasan Elementary School
Victoria Elementary School
Victory Fundamental Baptist Academy
Wise Kids School of Muntinlupa, Inc.
Emmanuel John Institute of Science And Technology, Inc.
Tunasan National High School

Poblacion
Christian Love School
Itaas Elementary School
Poblacion Elementary School
Liceo de Piccolo Santo
Lombosco Academy Foundation, Inc.
Muntinlupa Christian Academy
Muntinlupa Elementary School
Muntinlupa National High School
Poblacion National High School
Our Lady of The Abandoned Catholic School
Plena Gracia Learning School
Pamantasan ng Lungsod ng Muntinlupa (PLMun)
Sacred Heart Institute
Southernside Montessori School
Spring Christian School
Sunshine Christian School of Muntinlupa

Putatan
Catherine McAuley Learning Center
Child's Mind Learning Center
Christ Baptist Academy
Christ the King School of Muntinlupa
Christ the Living Intercessor Christian School
Colegio de Nuestra Señora de Guadalupe
F. De Mesa Elementary School
Holy Infant Academy (Putatan Branch)
J.B. Kiddies Learning Center
Lakeview Elementary School
Lakewood School of Alabang
Living Light Academy
Mary Cause of our Joy Catholic School
Muntinlupa Cosmopolitan School
Muntinlupa Institute of Technology (MIT)
Putatan Elementary School
SEAM Christian Learning Center, Inc.
South Crest School
South Mansfield College
Soldier's Hills Elementary School

Bayanan
Bayanan Elementary School (Main Campus)
Bayanan Elementary School (Unit 1)
Little Angel's Learning Center
Maranatha Christian Academy - Bayanan
Maria Ferarri School
MBC-Sinai School
Mary, Mother of God Parochial School
Muntinlupa School for Child's Development
SEAM Christian Learning Center, Inc.
APEC Schools Bayanan

Alabang
Alabang Elementary School
Anima Christi Center for Learning and Human Development
Far Eastern University Alabang
Infant Jesus Learning Center - Alabang
Le Sainte School
Informatics College Northgate Alabang
Liceo de Alabang, Inc.
MIT International School
Saint Bernadette College of Alabang
Pedro E. Diaz High School
Saint Francis of Assisi College
Saint Peter School of Alabang
San Roque Catholic School
STI College (Alabang Branch)
Theresiana de Montealegre Dame School

Ayala Alabang
De La Salle Zobel School
Institute for Child Development
Maria Montessori Foundation
PAREF Woodrose School
The Learning Child School
Virgin Mary Immaculate School
PAREF Rosemont School

Cupang
Cupang Elementary School
Our Lady of the Lake School
PAREF Ridgefield School
PAREF Southridge School
Saint Bernadette College of Alabang
San Beda College Alabang
Kennedy International School of Business and Languages
Cupang Senior High School

Buli
Muntinlupa Business High School
Buli Elementary School
Facilities Management College

Sucat
Bagong Silang Elementary School
Bay View Academy
Miraculous Medal School
Saint Augustine School for the Deaf
Sucat Elementary School
Muntinlupa Business Highschool (Sucat Annex)
Sto. Domingo Pascual Academy, Inc.
Colegio De Muntinlupa

See also
List of schools in Metro Manila (primary and secondary)
List of international schools in Metro Manila
List of universities and colleges in Metro Manila

References

Muntinlupa